The United Nations Temporary Commission on Korea (UNTCOK) was a body that oversaw elections in U.S.-controlled South Korea in May 1948. The commission initially was composed of nine nations, and Australia, Canada and Syria played a dissenting role, resisting US plans to hold separate elections in South Korea. That position was in line with Korean moderates Kim Ku and Kim Kyu-sik.

In North Korea, supported by the Soviet Union, the body was not even recognized, with the Soviets arguing that the commission would break the 1945 Moscow Accords. The Soviets also argued that it violated Articles 32 and 107 of the UN Charter. Article 32 requires that both sides of the dispute be consulted, but Korean representatives from North and South Korea were never invited to address the UN. Also, Article 107 denied jurisdiction to the UN over postwar settlement issues.

See also
 Dr. George Patterson Canadian representative for UNTCOK
 1948 South Korean general election

References

 

Korean War
Cold War organizations